Igor Țîgîrlaș (born 24 February 1984) is a Moldovan football midfielder. He has also played for the Moldova national football team.

Career
Igor Țîgîrlaș started his football career at the Youth Football School in Chișinău. His first coaches were Nikolay Esin and Anatolii Nesmeyanov. At 16 years old he was invited to the Moldova U-17 team, which participated at "Football Federation of Moldova Cup". Having scored 2 goals and making 2 assists in three matches, and showing excellent performance, after the tournament he was invited by the Moldovan Champions - Sheriff Tiraspol.

Țîgîrlaș played 2 years for Sheriff's second team and in so doing drew the attention of Shakhtar Donetsk. He signed the contract with Ukrainian giant, and at the same time secured himself a starter spot on the Moldova U-21 team, for whom he played more than 20 matches.

In 2005 Țîgîrlaș spent first part of the year in Arsenal Kharkiv and then he was transferred to another Ukrainian team – FC Kharkiv, where, thanks to his universalism (Țîgîrlaș is able to play on the right or left flank, forward or offense), he has been one of important players of the team. After Vladimir Bessonov was named new head coach of FC Kharkiv, the club parted with Țîgîrlaș and most of the other foreign players.

In the Spring of 2007, Igor Țîgîrlaș came to Zimbru Chişinău on loan from FC Kharkiv. He played 10 matches in the Moldovan championship, scored 1 goal and made 9 assists. In the Moldova Cup final, Zimbru won against Nistru, and Țîgîrlaș won the first trophy of his career. Despite playing at Zimbru for only 3 months, at the end of the year, he was included in the symbolic "Zimbru 2006/07 Ideal Team". ».

Igor Țîgîrlaș was to win two more trophies in 2007. In the Summer, the Latvian champions, FK Ventspils, bought his transfer from FC Kharkiv. With FK Ventspils, Țîgîrlaș won both the Latvian championship and the Latvian Cup. He also played in the Baltic League final. He helped FK Ventspils to catch up with then leaders, Liepājas Metalurgs, despite 14 points handicap, and scored a crucial goal in a head-to-head match between the teams.

In 2009, his goal against BATE Borisov helped Ventspils to reach the Play-off Round of the UEFA Champions League and eventually play in UEFA Europa League group stage after losing to FC Zurich, against whom Țîgîrlaș also scored.

In February 2010, he joined Metalurh Zaporizhya in Ukraine. On 26 February 2011, it was announced that Țîgîrlaș joined Chornomorets on a 6-month loan from FC Metalurh Zaporizhya, with the right to purchase at the end of the season. This right was exercised in June, 2011, and Țîgîrlaș joined Chornomorets on a permanent basis.

Before the start of the 2012 season Igor was loaned to the Latvian Higher League club FK Ventspils. In June 2012 his contract with Chornomorets ended.

In February 2013, Țîgîrlaș signed for Kazakhstan Premier League club FC Astana.

Champions League 
In the same 2007 year Țîgîrlaș debuted in UEFA Champions League, where he played 4 matches. In the 1st qualifying round FK Ventspils won against Wales champions - TNK, in the 2nd round Latvian team was eliminated by "Red Bull-Salzburg"  (Austria). In 2008/2009 season FK Ventspils was close to 3rd qualifying round of Champions League but lost to SK Brann.

Moldova National team
Until 2006 Igor Țîgîrlaș was key player of Moldova U-21 team, for which he played 21 matches. In 2007 Țîgîrlaș was invited for the first time to National team of Moldova.

International goal
Scores and results list Moldova's goal tally first.

Achievements
 Moldova Cup winner with Zimbru – 2007.
 Latvia Champion with FK Ventspils – 2007
 Latvia Cup winner with FK Ventspils – 2007.

References

External links
 Igor Ţîgîrlaş: «I should progress further» Exclusive interview for popular site moldfootball.com, 17 January 2008 (rus)
 Igor Ţîgîrlaş – universal player 29 March 2008 (rus)
 Ventspils coach on Igor Ţîgîrlaş 20 January 2008 (rus)
 
 
 

1984 births
Living people
Moldovan footballers
Moldova international footballers
Moldovan expatriate footballers
Expatriate footballers in Ukraine
Expatriate footballers in Latvia
Expatriate footballers in Belarus
Expatriate footballers in Kazakhstan
Expatriate footballers in Romania
Moldovan expatriate sportspeople in Latvia
Moldovan expatriate sportspeople in Ukraine
Moldovan expatriate sportspeople in Belarus
Moldovan expatriate sportspeople in Romania
Moldovan Super Liga players
Ukrainian Premier League players
Liga II players
FC Shakhtar Donetsk players
FC Shakhtar-2 Donetsk players
FC Shakhtar-3 Donetsk players
FC Arsenal Kharkiv players
FC Kharkiv players
FC Zimbru Chișinău players
FK Ventspils players
FC Metalurh Zaporizhzhia players
FC Chornomorets Odesa players
FC Gomel players
FC Astana players
FC Solli Plyus Kharkiv players
CSF Bălți players
ACS Poli Timișoara players
Association football midfielders